Earl Levine developed streaming media and audio watermarking technologies during the dot-com bubble of the late 1990s. He worked at VXtreme until its acquisition by Microsoft. Following that he worked for Liquid Audio. Liquid Audio's patent portfolio was acquired by Microsoft in 2002. Since his departure from Liquid Audio, he has been involved with numerous Silicon Valley start-up companies.

He is also known for his successful hobby of training race horses including Fleet Crossing who won the Churchill Downs, MSW 

He established one of the first shared neighborhood wi-fi systems in 2002 

He graduated from Richardson High School in the same class as Carla Overbeck.

His son, Gabrael Levine, is the inventor of the Blackbird bipedal robot and the preeminent developer of the OpenTorque actuator.

References

External links
 MOUSE.MOVE
 Neural network data compression paper

21st-century American inventors
Computer programmers
Stanford University alumni
Living people
Year of birth missing (living people)